Turkoman, also known as Turcoman, was a term for the people of Oghuz Turkic origin, widely used during the Middle Ages. Oghuz Turks were a western Turkic people that, in the 8th century A.D, formed a tribal confederation in an area between the Aral and Caspian seas in Central Asia, and spoke the Oghuz branch of the Turkic language family.

Turkmen, originally an exonym, dates from the High Middle Ages, along with the ancient and familiar name "Turk", and tribal names such as "Bayat", "Bayandur", "Afshar", and "Kayi". By the 10th century, Islamic sources were calling Oghuz Turks as Muslim Turkmens, as opposed to Shamanist or Buddhist Turks. It entered into the usage of the Western world through the Byzantines in the 12th century, since by that time Oghuz Turks were overwhelmingly Muslim. Later, the term "Oghuz" was gradually supplanted by "Turkmen" among Oghuz Turks themselves, thus turning an exonym into an endonym, a process which was completed by the beginning of the 13th century.

In Anatolia, since the Late Middle Ages, "Turkmen" was superseded by the term "Ottoman", which came from the name of the Ottoman Empire and its ruling dynasty. It remains as an endonym of semi-nomadic tribes of the Terekeme, a sub-ethnic group of the Azerbaijani people.

Today, a significant percentage of residents of Azerbaijan, Turkey, and Turkmenistan are descendants of Oghuz Turks (Turkmens), and the languages they speak belong to the Oghuz group of the Turkic language family. As of the early 21st century, this ethnonym is still used by the Turkmens of Central Asia, the main population of Turkmenistan, who have sizeable groups in Iran, Afghanistan and Russia, as well as Iraqi and Syrian Turkmens, the other descendants of Oghuz Turks.

Etymology and history 

The current majority view for the etymology of the ethnonym Türkmen or Turcoman is that it comes from Türk and the Turkic emphasizing suffix -men, meaning "'most Turkish of the Turks' or 'pure-blooded Turks.'" A  folk etymology, dating back to the Middle Ages and found in al-Biruni and Mahmud al-Kashgari, instead derives the suffix -men from the Persian suffix -mānind, with the resulting word meaning "like a Turk". While formerly the dominant etymology in modern scholarship, this mixed Turkic-Persian derivation is now viewed as incorrect.

The first-known mention of the term "Turkmen", "Turkman" or "Turkoman" occurs near the end of the 10th century A.D in Islamic literature by the Arab geographer al-Muqaddasi in Ahsan Al-Taqasim Fi Ma'rifat Al-Aqalim. In his work, which was completed in 987 A.D, al-Muqaddasi writes about Turkmens twice while depicting the region as the frontier of the Muslim possessions in Central Asia. According to medieval Islamic authors Al-Biruni and al-Marwazi, the term Turkmen referred to the Oghuz who converted to Islam. There is evidence, however, that non-Oghuz Turks such as Karluks also have been called Turkomans and Turkmens. Later during the Middle Ages, the term was extensively employed for Oghuz Turks, a western Turkic people, who established a large tribal confederation called Oghuz Yabgu in the 8th century A.D. This polity, whose inhabitants spoke Oghuz Turkic, occupied an area between the Aral and Caspian seas in Central Asia.

The Seljuqs appeared in the beginning of the 11th century in Mawarannahr. Muslim Oghuz people, generally identified as Turkmens by then, rallied around the Qinik tribe that made up the core of the future Seljuq tribal union and the state they would create in the 11th century.

Since the Seljuk era, the sultans of the dynasty created military settlements in parts of the Near and Middle East to strengthen their power; large Turkmen settlements were created in Syria, Iraq, and Eastern Anatolia. After the Battle of Manzikert, the Oghuz extensively settled throughout Anatolia and Azerbaijan. In the 11th century, Turkmens densely populated Arran. The 12th-century Persian writer al-Marwazi wrote about the arrival of Turkmens to Muslim lands, portraying them as people of noble character who are strong and persistent in battle because of their nomadic lifestyle, and calling them sultans (rulers).

"Turkoman" entered into the usage of the Western world through the Byzantines in the 12th century. By the beginning of 13th century, it became an endonym among Oghuz Turks themselves.

The Turkmens also included the Yiva and Bayandur tribes, from which the ruling clans of the states of Qara Qoyunlu and Aq Qoyunlu emerged. After the fall of Aq Qoyunlu, the Turkmen tribes—partly under their own name, for example Afshars, Hajilu, Pornak, Deger, and Mavsellu—united in a Turkmen Qizilbash tribal confederation.

Modern use 

In Anatolia in the late Middle Ages, the term "Turkmen" was gradually supplanted by the term "Ottomans". The Ottoman ruling class identified themselves as Ottomans until the 19th century. In the late 19th century, as the Ottomans adopted European ideas of nationalism, they preferred to return to a more common term Turk instead of Turkmen, whereas previously Turk was used to exclusively refer to Anatolian peasants.

The term continued to be used interchangeably with other ethnohistorical terms for the Turkic people of the area, including Turk, Tatar and Ajam, well into the early 20th century. In the early 21st century, "Turkmen" remains as the self-name for the semi-nomadic tribes of the Terekime, a sub-ethnic group of the Azerbaijani people.

In the early 21st century, the ethnonyms "Turkoman" and "Turkmen" are still used by the Turkmens of Turkmenistan, who have sizeable groups in Iran, Afghanistan, Russia, Uzbekistan, Tajikistan and Pakistan, as well as Iraqi and Syrian Turkmens, descendants of the Oghuz Turks who mostly adhere to an Anatolian Turkish heritage and identity. Most Iraqi and Syrian Turkmens are descendants of Ottoman soldiers, traders, and civil servants who were taken into Iraq from Anatolia during the rule of the Ottoman Empire. Turks of Israel and Lebanon, Turkish sub-ethnic groups of Yoruks and Karapapaks (sub-ethnic group of Azerbaijanis) are also referred to as Turkmens.

"Turkoman", "Turkmen", "Turkman" and "Torkaman" were – and continue to be – used interchangeably.

Culture 

By the 10th century A.D, Turkmens were predominantly Muslim. They later found themselves divided into Sunni and Shia branches of Islam. Medieval Turkmens markedly contributed to the expansion of Islam with their extensive conquests of previously Christian lands, specifically those of Byzantine Anatolia and the Caucasus.

Language 

Turkmens primarily spoke languages that belong or belonged to the Oghuz branch of Turkic languages, which included such languages and dialects as Seljuq, Old Anatolian Turkish, and old Ottoman Turkish. Kashgari had cited phonetic, lexical and grammatical features of the language of Oghuz-Turkmens; he also identified several dialects and presented a couple of examples displaying the differences.

Old Anatolian language, introduced to Anatolia by Seljuk Turkmens who migrated westward from Central Asia to Khorasan and further to Anatolia during the Seljuk expansion in the 11th century, was widely spoken by Turkmens of the area until the 15th century. It is also one of the known ancient languages within the Oghuz group of Turkic languages, along with old Ottoman. It displays certain characteristics peculiar to eastern Oghuz languages such as modern Turkmen and Khorasani Turkic languages, rather than western Oghuz languages such as Turkish or Azerbaijani. Such Old Anatolian Turkic features as bol- "to be(come)", also present in modern Turkmen and Khorasani Turkic, is ol in modern Turkish.

Literature 

Book of Dede Korkut is considered an Oghuz masterpiece. Other prominent works of literature produced during the High Middle Ages also include the Oghuzname, Battalname, Danishmendname,  epics, which are part of the literary history of Azerbaijanis, Turks of Turkey, and Turkmens.

The Book of Dede Korkut is a collection of epics and stories bearing witness to the language, the way of life, religions, traditions and social norms of the Oghuz Turks.

Notes

References

Further reading
 
 

History of the Turkish people
Oghuz Turks
Ethnic groups in the Middle East
Nomadic groups in Eurasia
Central Asian people
History of Turkmenistan
Medieval Azerbaijan
Medieval history of Iran
Historical ethnic groups of Asia